The Africa Zone was the unique zone within Group 4 of the regional Davis Cup competition in 2019. The zone's competition was held in round robin format in Brazzaville, Republic of Congo, from 26 to 29 June 2019.

Participating nations

Inactive nations

Draw
Date: 26–29 June

Location: Kintélé Sports Complex, Brazzaville, Republic of Congo (hard)

Format: Round-robin basis.

Seeding

 1Davis Cup Rankings as of 4 February 2019

Round Robin

Pool A

Pool B 

Standings are determined by: 1. number of wins; 2. number of matches; 3. in two-team ties, head-to-head records; 4. in three-team ties, (a) percentage of sets won (head-to-head records if two teams remain tied), then (b) percentage of games won (head-to-head records if two teams remain tied), then (c) Davis Cup rankings.

Playoffs

Round Robin

Pool A

Ghana vs. Gabon

Cameroon vs. Gabon

Cameroon vs. Ghana

Pool B

Rwanda vs. Congo

Botswana vs. Uganda

Rwanda vs. Botswana

Uganda vs. Congo

Rwanda vs. Uganda

Botswana vs. Congo

Playoffs

1st to 2nd playoff

Ghana vs. Rwanda

3rd to 4th playoff

Cameroon vs. Uganda

5th to 6th playoff

Botswana vs. Gabon

References

External links
Official Website

Africa Zone Group IV
Davis Cup Europe/Africa Zone